Adriaan Dirk Neeleman (born 7 November 1964, Rotterdam) is a Dutch linguist based in the UK. He is Professor of Linguistics at University College London.

He completed his PhD at the University of Utrecht in 1994. His research focusses on syntax, semantics and phonology, and particularly on the interfaces between them. His work is part of the tradition of generative grammar.

Neeleman is co-author of the monographs Flexible Syntax: A Theory of Case and Arguments (1998; with Fred Weerman) and Beyond Morphology (2004; with Peter Ackema).

References

1964 births
Living people
Linguists from the Netherlands
Syntacticians
Utrecht University alumni
Mass media people from Rotterdam